Attimore Hall Halt was a halt station on the Great Northern Railway in Hertfordshire, England. The station was built near what is now the town of Welwyn Garden City, which would be established in 1920, after the station closed. It was on the Hertford and Welwyn Junction Railway.

History
The station opened to the public in May 1905, although it was a quiet station, which resulted in the closure one month later. The station was demolished.

Route

See also
List of closed railway stations in Britain

Notes

Disused railway stations in Hertfordshire
Former Great Northern Railway stations
Railway stations in Great Britain opened in 1905
Railway stations in Great Britain closed in 1905
1905 disestablishments in England